Saint-Gabriel is a town in the Lanaudière region of Quebec, Canada, part of the D'Autray Regional County Municipality. It is located on the shores of Lake Maskinongé, in the shadows of the Laurentian Mountains.

History
The first settlers were Loyalists, Irish, and Scottish, arriving around 1825 to the shores of Lake Maskinongé, where they formed a community that was known as Lake Maskinongé Settlement by 1827, and later as the Mission of Lac-Maskinongé. In 1837, the name Saint-Gabriel-du-Lac-Maskinongé came in use but was changed to Saint-Gabriel-de-Brandon in 1840. This name refers to the angel Gabriel and the geographic township of Brandon that was proclaimed in 1827 and in which it is located.

In 1851, the Parish of Saint-Gabriel-de-Brandon was founded and the post office opened that same year. In 1855, the Saint-Gabriel-de-Brandon Parish Municipality was established  and the town of Saint-Gabriel remained part of this parish municipality until 1892, when it separated and became the Village Municipality of Saint-Gabriel-de-Brandon. In 1967, it changed its status and name to Ville de Saint-Gabriel by then Mayor Yvan Comeau.

Demographics 

Population trend:
 Population in 2011: 2844 (2006 to 2011 population change: 0.6%)
 Population in 2006: 2828
 Population in 2001: 2775
 Population in 1996: 2862
 Population in 1991: 2710

Mother tongue:
 English as first language: 3.5%
 French as first language: 96.1%
 English and French as first language: 0%
 Other as first language: 0.4%

Education

The Sir Wilfrid Laurier School Board operates anglophone public schools, including:
 Joliette Elementary School in Saint-Charles-Borromée
 Joliette High School in Joliette

See also
List of cities in Quebec

References

External links

Saint-Gabriel - MRC d'Autray

Incorporated places in Lanaudière
Cities and towns in Quebec
Designated places in Quebec